Tyler Rogers is an American former gridiron football quarterback. He played college football at the New Mexico State University from 2014 to 2017.

Early years
Rogers was born in approximately 1995, the son of Douglas and Pamela Rogers. He attended Liberty High School in Peoria, Arizona. He passed for 5,903 yards and 76 touchdowns in his high school career. He began his college football career playing for Arizona Western College in Yuma, Arizona, in 2013; he passed for 1,832 yards and 14 touchdowns in one season at Arizona Western.

New Mexico State
Rogers joined the New Mexico State football team in 2014 as a junior college transfer. He passed for 2,779 yards and 19 touchdowns in 2014, missed most of the 2015 season after suffering a broken thumb against the New Mexico Lobos on October 3, and passed for 2,603 yards and 16 touchdowns as a redshirt junior in 2016. He was granted a medical hardship waiver which granted him one additional year of eligibility.

As a redshirt senior in 2017, Rogers passed for 4,016 yards, which ranked eighth among all NCAA Division I Football Bowl Subdivision (FBS) players. He concluded his collegiate career as one of the top offensive players in program history, ranking second (behind Chase Holbrook) with 10,372 passing yards, 10,965 yards of total offense, 83 combined passing and rushing touchdowns, and 69 passing touchdowns.

Professional career
On May 18, 2018, Rogers signed with the Calgary Stampeders.

References

External links
 New Mexico State profile

Year of birth missing (living people)
Living people
American football quarterbacks
American players of Canadian football
Canadian football quarterbacks
Arizona Western Matadors football players
Calgary Stampeders players
New Mexico State Aggies football players
People from Peoria, Arizona
Sportspeople from the Phoenix metropolitan area
Players of American football from Arizona